The 1978–79 La Liga was the 48th season since its establishment. It started on September 2, 1978, and finished on June 3, 1979.

Team locations

League table

Results table

Pichichi Trophy

References 
 La Liga 1978/1979
 Primera División 1978/79
 List of La Liga Champions

External links 
  Official LFP Site

La Liga seasons
1978–79 in Spanish football leagues
Spain